5-hydroxytryptamine receptor 3A is a protein that in humans is encoded by the HTR3A gene.

The product of this gene belongs to the ligand-gated ion channel receptor superfamily. This gene encodes subunit A of the type 3 receptor for 5-hydroxytryptamine (serotonin), a biogenic hormone that functions as a neurotransmitter, a hormone, and a mitogen. This receptor causes fast, depolarizing responses in neurons after activation. The A subunit is the only one that can be expressed alone and forms homomers with a very low single channel conductance of 0.6pS. When combined with the B subunit and expressed as a heteromer, the single channel conductance increases immensely. Alternatively spliced transcript variants encoding different isoforms have been identified.

See also
 5-HT3 receptor

References

Further reading

External links
 

Ion channels
Serotonin receptors